The reef triggerfish (Rhinecanthus rectangulus), also known as the rectangular triggerfish, wedgetail triggerfish or by its Hawaiian name humuhumunukunukuāpuaa (meaning 'triggerfish with a snout like a pig', also spelled humuhumunukunukuapua'a or just humuhumu for short), is one of several species of triggerfish. It is found at reefs in the Indo-Pacific and is the state fish of Hawaii.

The name humuhumunukunukuāpuaa is both singular and plural. The fish shares its Hawaiian name with the lagoon triggerfish (R. aculeatus), another fish of the Indo-Pacific.

Description
The triggerfish's teeth and top lip are blue and the teeth are set close together inside its relatively plump mouth.

It has a small second dorsal spine which is used to lock its main spine into an upright position. When sheltering in a small crevice, this locking helps protect the fish against extraction by a predator. When fleeing predators, it sometimes makes grunting noises, possibly to warn nearby triggerfish.

The triggerfish can blow jets of water from its mouth to help it find benthic invertebrates under the substrate. It can often be seen spitting sand from its mouth, sifting the material for edible detritus or organisms.

This is particularly true in captivity. They have the ability to rapidly alter their coloration. They can fade into a relatively drab appearance when sleeping or demonstrating submission, while their coloration is often the most vivid when they are healthy and unthreatened by their surroundings. They have also been known to bite and attack swimmers in their area, often around the ankle, sometimes leaving marks.

Hawaii state fish
The reef triggerfish was designated the official fish of Hawaii in 1985, but due to an expiration of a Hawaiian state law after five years, it ceased to be the state fish in 1990. On April 17, 2006, bill HB1982 was presented to the Governor of Hawaii, which permanently reinstated the reef triggerfish (humuhumunukunukuāpuaa) as the state fish of Hawaii. The bill passed into law on May 2, 2006.

Decades prior to official recognition, humuhumunukunukuāpuaa were considered a symbol of Hawai'i, particularly as a symbol of Kamapuaʻa, one of the most prominent kupuas in Hawaiian folklore.

It is also featured prominently in the Disney Channel Original Movie High School Musical 2 with a song of the same name.

References

Further reading

External links
 

reef triggerfish
Fish of the Pacific Ocean
Fish of Hawaii
Fish of the Indian Ocean
Symbols of Hawaii
reef triggerfish